En Concert is a live album by singer-songwriter Jack Johnson, project released in the U.S. in late 2009. All songs on the album were recorded live during the "Sleep Through the Static World Tour" in 2008 where 100% of the tour profits and profits from this release will be going to fund the Kokua Hawaii Foundation and the Johnson Ohana Charitable Foundation to support environmental art, and music education around the world. It was released as an iTunes LP on the iTunes Store in late 2009.

Track listing
 "Belle"/"Banana Pancakes" – 6:19
 "If I Had Eyes" 4:11
 "Do You Remember"/"Remember" – 3:46
 "Sleep Through the Static" – 4:19
 "Flake" – 5:27
 "Bubble Toes"/"Express Yourself" – 4:18
 "Wasting Time" – 5:01
 "What You Thought You Need" – 3:57
 "Country Road" – 2:58 (Jack Johnson & Paula Fuga)
 "Staple It Together" – 4:02
 "Sitting, Waiting, Wishing" – 3:25
 "Constellations" – 3:31 (Jack Johnson & Eddie Vedder)
 "The Horizon Has Been Defeated"/"Mother and Child Reunion" – 4:23
 "Good People" – 3:36"
 "All at Once" – 3:45
 "Gone" – 2:08
 "Home" – 3:17
 "Times Like These" – 2:20
 "Angel"/"Better Together" – 6:13
 "Go On"/"Upside Down" (Palais Omnisports, Bercy, Peris) iTunes Bonus

Disc 2: DVD

 Intro (If I Had Eyes – 11 Seconds – Palais Omnisports, Bercy, Paris)
 Sleep Through the Static (Palais Omnisports, Bercy, Paris)
 Belle (Palais Omnisports, Bercy, Paris)
 Banana Pancakes (Palais Omnisports, Bercy, Paris)
 No Other Way (Olympia Reitanlage, Munich)
 Good People (Olympia Reitanlage, Munich)
 Staple It Together (Olympia Reitanlage, Munich)
 Flake (Zuiderpark, The Hague)
 Bubbletoes (Zuiderpark, The Hague)
 Go On (Kindl-Buhne Wuhlheide, Berlin)
 Constellations (Watergate Bay, Newquay, UK)
 Hope (Hyde Park, London)
 Wasting Time (Hyde Park, London)
 Hi Tide, Low Tide (Hyde Park, London)
 If I Had Eyes (Hyde Park for 3:00 Min then Paris for 1:23)
 All at Once (Palais Omnisports, Bercy, Paris)
 Angel/Better Together (Palais Omnisports, Bercy, Paris)
 Monsoon (Palais Omnisports, Bercy, Paris)
 Rainbow/Buddha (Palais Omnisports, Bercy, Paris)

Musicians
 Jack Johnson – lead vocals, guitar
 Adam Topol – drums, percussion
 Merlo Podlewski – bass guitar
 Zach Gill – piano, accordion, percussion, background vocals

Jack Johnson (musician) albums
2009 live albums
Brushfire Records live albums
Universal Music Group live albums